Edmundo Cetina Velázquez (1896–1959) was a Mexican philosopher.

People from Tabasco
1896 births
1959 deaths
20th-century Mexican philosophers